Michael Knowles (born 21 May 1942) is a British Conservative politician and former Member of Parliament.

Political career
From 1971-1983 he was a member of the Council of the Royal Borough of Kingston upon Thames and Leader of the Council from 1974–1983.

Knowles first stood for Parliament for the Labour Welsh stronghold of Merthyr Tydfil at the February 1974 General Election, coming third. In the October election of that year he fought the London seat of Brent East, again being defeated.

He was elected MP for Nottingham East from 1983 until he lost the seat at the 1992 general election to Labour's John Heppell.

References
The Times Guide to the House of Commons, Times Newspapers Ltd, 1992

External links 
 

1942 births
Living people
Conservative Party (UK) MPs for English constituencies
UK MPs 1983–1987
UK MPs 1987–1992
Councillors in the Royal Borough of Kingston upon Thames